Brachychiton (kurrajong, bottletree) is a genus of 31 species of trees and large shrubs, native to Australia (the centre of diversity, with 30 species), and New Guinea (one species). Fossils from New South Wales and New Zealand are estimated to be 50 million years old, corresponding to the Paleogene.

They grow to 4 – 30m tall, and some are dry-season deciduous. Several species (though not all) are pachycaul plants with a very stout stem for their overall size, used to store water during periods of drought. The leaves show intraspecific variation and generally range from entire to deeply palmately lobed with long slender leaflet-like lobes joined only right at the base. Their sizes range from 4 – 20 cm long and wide.

All species are monoecious with separate male and female flowers on the same plant. The flowers have a bell-shaped perianth consisting of a single series of fused lobes which is regarded as a calyx despite being brightly coloured in most species. The female flowers have five separate carpels that can each form a woody fruit containing several seeds. The flower colour is often variable within species. Eastern forest species drop their foliage before flowering but those of the drier regions carry the flowers while in leaf.

A few species of Kurrajong, as the tree is known in the Dharuk language, are popular garden trees and have been introduced to hot dry regions including the Mediterranean, South Africa and the western United States. These species are also hybridised for horticultural purposes, B. populneo-acerifolius being one example. Kurrajongs are known to bloom erratically in cultivation.

Name
The name Brachychiton is derived from the Greek brachys, short, and chiton, tunic, in referring to its loose seed coats. The generic name is often misconstrued as being of neuter gender, with the specific epithets then incorrectly amended. Thus B. rupestre and B. populneum are sometimes seen in horticultural books and magazines.

Kurrajong comes from Dharuk garrajuŋ "fishing line", as fishing lines were made from kurrajong bark.

Species

Species include:

References

Further reading

Macoboy, S. (1991) What tree is that?, 
Rathie, Kerry (2014) Brachychitons: Flame Trees, Kurrajongs and Bottle Trees

External links

 Notes on Fossil Leaves, Stewart R. Hinsley, 2005
 PlantList search for Brachychiton. Retrieved 20190318.

 
Malvaceae genera